Vatican News is a Catholic news website provided by the Vatican's Dicastery for Communication that partners with Vatican Radio, L'Osservatore Romano, and Vatican Media to provide multimedia pertaining to the global Catholic Church and the operations of the Holy See.

History

Background 
A website under the name News.va launched on 27 June 2011.
It was sometimes referred to as The Vatican Today. News.va launched The Pope App in January 2013.

Founding 
On 27 June 2015, Pope Francis, through a motu proprio ("on his own initiative") apostolic letter, established the Secretariat for Communications in the Roman Curia, and News.va and the Pontifical Council were expected to be incorporated in it eventually. The Vatican News website lists this date as the beginning of the publication.

References

External links
 Vatican News official website

Dicastery for Communication
Vatican City news websites